Monique Roffey (born 1965), FRSL, is a Trinidadian-born British writer and memoirist. Her novels have been much acclaimed, winning awards including the 2013 OCM Bocas Prize for Caribbean Literature, for Archipelago, and the Costa Book of the Year award, for The Mermaid of Black Conch in 2021.

Biography

Born in Port of Spain, Trinidad, in 1965, to an English father and mother of French, Italian, Maltese and Lebanese descent. Roffey was educated at St Andrew's School in Maraval, Trinidad, and then in the UK at St Maur's Convent, and St George's College, Weybridge. She graduated with a BA in English and Film Studies from the University of East Anglia in 1987, and later completed an MA and PhD in Creative Writing at Lancaster University. Between 2002 and 2006 she was a Centre Director for the Arvon Foundation.

Roffey is an experienced creative writing tutor and has taught for numerous creative writing providers and organisations, including The National Writers Centre, First Story, The Arvon Foundation and English PEN. She is a Professor of Contemporary Fiction at Manchester Metropolitan University, teaching creative writing on the novel route MA.. Since 2013, she has been a literary activist and advocate for emerging writers in Trinidad, teaching for COSTAATT, Bocas Lit Fest and privately in Port of Spain, where she set up the St James Writers’ Room in 2014 and numerous other writing workshops since. She has also co-led writing retreats in Trinidad in collaboration with other Caribbean writers such as Professor Loretta Collins-Klobah in partnership with Mount Plaisir Estate in Grande Riviere, Trinidad. Roffey has dual nationality, British and Trinidadian. She is a Fellow of the Royal Society of Literature and a co-founder of the group Writers Rebel inside Extinction Rebellion. She is also a mitra of the Triratna Buddhist order.

Works 

Roffey has written six novels and a memoir. Sun Dog (2002), set in west London, is a magical realist tale of psychological estrangement, identity loss and subsequent individuation. The White Woman on the Green Bicycle (2009; shortlisted for the 2010 Orange Prize and the 2011 Encore Award), is the story of European ex-colonials living in Trinidad during the island's early Independence years and their subsequent process of creolisation. It was hailed by Commonwealth Prize-winner Olive Senior, who said:
“…it breaks entirely new ground. It is a major contribution to the New Wave of Caribbean writing: energetic, uncompromising, bold in the choice of narrative devices and a great read.”
It has been published to critical acclaim in the UK, United States and Europe.

Roffey's 2011 memoir, With the Kisses of His Mouth, is a personal account of a mid-life quest for sexual liberation and self-identification other than the aspirant hetero-normative model. It has been characterised as "a subversive work that transcends the author's personal story: it stands alone in the chasm that has opened between feminist literature and the belles du jour brigade."

Her novel Archipelago, published in July 2012, set in the aftermath of a flood, examines climate change from the perspective of a man from the southern Caribbean. Andrew Miller (Costa Award winner, 2011) said: "Archipelago is beautifully done. There's a warmth to it, an exuberance and a wisdom, that makes the experience of reading it feel not just pleasurable but somehow instructive. It's funny, sometimes bitingly poignant. And how well Roffey writes a male central character. A brilliant piece of storytelling." Archipelago won the 2013 OCM Bocas Prize for Caribbean Literature, whose judges commended it for its "exploration of the greater Caribbean space in which is embedded a real-life story of trauma and loss and ultimately redemption that is both contemporary and compelling". The novel was judged the winner of the fiction category of the prize, and at the Bocas Lit Fest was announced on 27 April 2013 as the best overall book from all categories.

Roffey's 2014 novel, House of Ashes, is a fictionalised account of the events surrounding the 1990 attempted coup in Trinidad. Ronald Adamolekun, for Wasafiri magazine, said: House of Ashes will be remembered as the most authoritative fictionalised account of the 1990 Trinidad and Tobago revolution, arguably the darkest moment of the island’s history."

The Telegraph called it "vigorous, grimly absorbing tale", while The Observer′s reviewer concluded: "Roffey's writing is raw and visceral and she thrusts her readers headlong into the very middle of the action, her pen as powerful as the butts of the guns shoved in her hostages' backs."

A fifth novel, The Tryst, published in July 2017, was sold twice, first to Simon and Schuster UK, and then to independent press Dodo Ink. Having worked on it, on and off, for 14 years, Roffey revisits the tale of Adam's first wife, Lilith, and examines the common but taboo issue of celibacy within marriage. Like much of Roffey's work, it weaves magical realism into a contemporary setting. Many well known literary writers, sex writers and sex workers have applauded The Tryst. DBC Pierre said of it: "Not a shade of grey within a mile of this book. What makes The Tryst an unexploded virus isn't just the quality and brightness of Roffey's writing on sex, even as it uncovers inner glades between flesh and fantasy where sex resides – but the taunting clarity of why those glades stay covered. A throbbing homewrecker of a tale, too late to call Fifty Shades of Red." Hollywood actor Gabriel Byrne said, "The Tryst is a gorgeously written page turner, deceptive in its simplicity. Monique Roffey writes an erotically charged fable that mixes the real with the mythological, a truly unsettling and disturbing novel. She writes about lust and sex in a way that is thrillingly sexy and beautiful." 

Rowan Pelling, editor of The Amorist, also said: "The Tryst is a sly, feral, witty, offbeat erotic novella that unsettles the reader, even as it arouses. There are sex scenes of breath-taking audacity. What would any of us do if an irresistible sex daemon broke and entered our domestic lives, leaving havoc in her amoral wake? Monique Roffey knows that the real question about human desire is whether we even recognise our deepest yearnings. How can anyone resist what they have never even dreamt of?" 

The Mermaid of Black Conch was first published in April 2020 by Peepal Tree Press and won the Costa Fiction Award 2020 and the Costa Book of the Year, 2020. It was nominated for seven awards in total, being shortlisted for the Rathbones/Folio Prize, 2021, The Goldsmiths Award, 2020 and the Republic of Consciousness Award, 2021. It was published in paperback by Vintage books, in June 2021. It was a Radio 4 Book of the Week in August 2021. Film Four and Dorothy Street Pictures have bought the screen adaptation rights. Roffey's sixth novel The Mermaid of Black Conch (2020) won the Costa Book of the Year award, announced in January 2021. 

A writer of dual nationality and perspective, Roffey writes about sex, fatherhood, the Caribbean, mermaids, Lilith and other outcasts, be they the terminally awkward August Chalmin (in Sun Dog), the left-behind Europeans in Trinidad (George and Sabine Harwood in The White Woman on the Green Bicycle), a cursed mermaid, a celibate wife or indeed herself. Stylistically, her books can be linked in terms of post-modern narrative choices, in that they often weave together magical realism, real-life historical characters and events, biography and autobiography to tackle themes of alienation and otherness.

Bibliography 

Sun Dog (2002), Scribner, Simon & Schuster UK
"Finale" (short story; 2005), in New Writing 13, Picador
The White Woman on the Green Bicycle (2009), Simon & Schuster UK
The Global Village, Tell Tales (co-editor; 2009), Peepal Tree Press.
With the Kisses of His Mouth (memoir; 2011), Simon & Schuster UK
Archipelago (2012), Simon & Schuster UK
House of Ashes (2014), Simon & Schuster UK
The Tryst (2017), Dodo InkThe Mermaid of Black Conch (2020), Peepal Tree Press

 Awards 

2010: Orange Prize, shortlisted for The White Woman on the Green Bicycle2011: Encore Award, shortlisted for The White Woman on the Green Bicycle2013: OCM Bocas Prize for Caribbean Literature, winner of overall and fiction categories for Archipelago2014: Orion Book Award, shortlisted for Archipelago2015: Costa Book Awards shortlisted for House of Ashes2015: OCM Bocas Prize for Caribbean Literature long list, fiction, for House of Ashes2020: Goldsmiths Prize shortlisted for The Mermaid of Black Conch2021: Costa Book of the Year award for The Mermaid of Black Conch2021: Rathbones/Folio Prize shortlisted for The Mermaid of Black2021: Republic of Consciousness Prize short listed for The Mermaid of Black Conch
2021: The Orwell Prize for Political Fiction, 2021 long listed for The Mermaid of Black Conch
2021: Ondaatje Prize for place writing, 2021 long listed for the Mermaid of Black Conch
2021: OCM Bocas Fiction Award short listed for The Mermaid of Black Conch

Further reading

 .
 Owen, Katie. "A Man for All Seasons; New Fiction". Review of Sun Dog, by Monique Roffey. The Times, 15 June 2002: 14.
 Woodhead, Cameron. Review of The White Woman on the Green Bicycle, by Monique Roffey. Age, 27 June 2009: 26.

References

 External links 
 Official Website
 Staff Profile at MMU, Department of English
 Skyros Course Facilitator
 British Council Writers
 Interview by Arifa Akbar: "5 minutes with Monique Roffey", The Independent, 24 July 2009.
 Amanda Smyth Interviews Monique Roffey: 2010 "Trini and Amanda", Writers' Hub, 2 August 2010.
 Monique Roffey, "'Please sit down, I have something shocking to say…'", The Guardian, 18 June 2011.
 Monique Roffey, "Women and sex: intimate adventurers", The Guardian, Comment is free, 6 July 2011.
 David Bainbridge, "Monique Roffey: 'My 40s have been boom years, action-packed'", The Observer, 4 March 2012.
 "Roffey’s odyssey With the Kisses of His Mouth to Archipelago", Trinidad Guardian, 6 May 2012.
 Claire Allfree, "Monique Roffey: My soul lies firmly in the Caribbean", London Metro, 19 July 2012.
 "Monique Roffey takes a voyage of discovery", The Herald Scotland, 3 October 2012.
 Shivanee Ramlochan, 2012 "Braving the Sea", Trinidad Guardian, 16 September 2012.
 Essay, "Why do women who dare to write about their sexual life still face the pillory?", The Independent, 15 September 2012.
 Interview, Small Talk, Financial Times, 2 November 2014, "Q&A with author Monique Roffey" 
 Interview by Danuta Kean, Monique Roffey interview: "Sex and power inform a very female coup", The Independent on Sunday, 22 July 2014
 Shivanee Ramlochan, "Big Caribbean Books of 2014", The Trinidad Guardian, 21 December 2014
 "Monique Roffey: The author on father figures, the nation's narcissism and New Year reflections" (interview), Saturday Independent, 28 December 2014 
 White Creole Conversations, Fresh Milk, 2015 
 Interview, Parallel Worlds, by Sophie Harris, Wasafiri, Issue 83, Autumn 2015 
  Kei Miller, "Marlon James’ Man Booker Prize heralds new Caribbean Era",The Guardian, 14 October 2015
 Essay, "Private Notes Made Public", Caribbean Quarterly, Volume 62, December, 2016 
 Essay, "Lotus, Nun, Mysterious, Advantages of Age", August 2016
 Simon Lee, "The Write of Retreating", The Trinidad Guardian, 28 January 2016
 Article, The Times, 27 June 2017
 Article, The Telegraph, 3 July 2017
 Interview, by Suzanne Portnoy, The Advantages of Age Review, The Guardian, 21 July 2017
 Review, TLS, 10 October 2017
 Review Shiny New books Review Lonesome Reader, 7 July 2017

 Interview Wasafari''

1965 births
Living people
People educated at St George's College, Weybridge
Alumni of the University of East Anglia
Trinidad and Tobago novelists
People from Port of Spain
Trinidad and Tobago women novelists
21st-century British women writers
21st-century British novelists
British memoirists
British women memoirists
21st-century memoirists
Trinidad and Tobago people of English descent
Trinidad and Tobago people of French descent
Trinidad and Tobago people of Italian descent
Trinidad and Tobago people of Maltese descent
Trinidad and Tobago people of Lebanese descent
English people of Trinidad and Tobago descent
English people of French descent
English people of Italian descent
English people of Maltese descent
English people of Lebanese descent